Granny is a 2017 indie survival horror video game developed and published by Dennis Vukanovic, under the name DVloper, as a spin-off to his earlier Slendrina series. The game features an unnamed protagonist trapped in a house, needing to solve puzzles while avoiding the titular Granny antagonist to get out of the house in a time period of five or six days.

Reviews for Granny were positive, which praised its tense atmosphere and gameplay, but some criticized its graphics. The latest update the game received was version 1.8, Android being updated on November 23, 2022 and iOS being updated on November 24, 2022.

Gameplay 
The game is centered on using a variety of items in a period of only five (or six, if a picture puzzle is completed) days to escape the house whilst avoiding the active stalking threat. The player can escape by removing the locks on the front door, by repairing the car in the garage, or by removing the locks from the vault door at the sewer tunnel. These all require a different set of items.

The player has an option to choose between five difficulties: Practice, where Granny is not home; Easy, Normal, Hard and Extreme. In each difficulty, apart from Practice, more locks appear on the front door with Granny becoming faster. Floors start to creak. There are also other options to turn on: Nightmare (which changes the game's music and textures), Extra Locks, and Darker. In Nightmare, spectral rats appear around the house which alert Granny, and both Extra Locks and Darker are forced on in Extreme. 

Granny roams around the house searching for the player, she uses any sound they make to her advantage and sets bear traps to hinder the player's progress. If caught, Granny will knock the player unconscious, which ends the current day, and onto the next, which spawns the player back in the main bedroom. The player can also get knocked out by several other environmental hazards found throughout the game such as Granny's spider or by falling down from the Attic. If the player is caught on the last day, one of five "game over" cutscenes play, and the player is sent back to the title screen. The player can defend themselves from Granny in a few ways such as making her unconscious or blinding her temporarily by using a variety of different traps and weapons that can be found in the house like the shotgun or pepper spray.

Plot 
The game's plot is left intentionally vague from the start. In the first game's Steam version, it starts with a cutscene of the player walking through the woods before being subsequently attacked by Granny. The player then awakens in a bed, which starts the game. According to a note found near the basement and evidence scattered throughout the house, the player is not the first person that Granny has trapped and may not be the last.

DVloper has said that the player does not have an identity since he wants it to be the person playing.

In Granny: Chapter Two, Grandpa is introduced who is Granny's husband and is based upon, or possibly, a war veteran. In this game's Steam cutscene, the player is lying in the first game's starting bed before being knocked out and driven to Grandpa's house.

In Granny 3, both platforms have a cutscene, where the player is walking towards the mansion's front gate and across the drawbridge which then shuts behind them.

In The Twins (another DVloper game), there is an option to have both Granny and Grandpa appear as extra antagonists, along with Bob and Buck, which make the game more difficult. In this game, if the player wears a mask of Slendrina and is nearby Granny: love hearts will appear around her head.

All 3 Granny games have references and easter eggs to DVloper's previous series, Slendrina, such as Slendrina's Child appearing in Granny: Chapter Two and Slendrina's Mom in Granny. But in Granny 3, it is confirmed that Slendrina is Granny's granddaughter in the game's description.

Removal from Steam 
Sometime in early May 2022, all three games were removed from Steam; the reason is unknown. DVloper tweeted that he is "working on the problem", but they have not yet been reinstated.

Reception 
The game became a viral hit on various social media platforms, becoming the second most viewed mobile video game in May 2018. It is rated 4.4 out of 5 stars on the Google Play Store, and 4.4 out of 5 on the App Store. The game also spawned itself numerous fangames and copies. The game has over 100 million downloads on Google Play.

William Lewinsky of Indie Game Critic gave the game 10 out of 10 stars, praising its controls as "very well implemented" and its sound effects as "stellar", while also stating that it was effective at scaring the player. Neilie Johnson of Common Sense Media gave the game a negative review, giving it 2 out of 5 stars, declaring that it "feels like a prototype for a more finished app", and criticizing its graphics as "bland", while nevertheless finding that it was frightening.

Sequels

Granny: Chapter Two 
A sequel, Granny: Chapter Two, was released for Android on September 6, 2019, iOS the following day, and on Microsoft Windows on December 30 of the same year.

Similar to the first installment, the player is once again trapped in a house. This game introduces another antagonist, Grandpa, who is harder of hearing and will not be alerted by most sounds. The player has the option to choose between Granny or Grandpa on lower difficulties, as opposed to harder difficulties like Hard and Extreme, in which both are automatically forced on.

There are new items and weapons in this game, and in addition to the front door escape, the player can also escape via helicopter or a motorboat. Two new monsters also pose a threat to the player, the giant octopus and Slendrina's Child. It initially received positive reviews.

Granny 3

The second sequel, Granny 3, was released for Android on June 3, 2021, and on Microsoft Windows on August 22 of the same year.

Due to Apple's publishing policies, Granny 3 is unavailable on iOS. DVloper explained that Apple considers the game as "spam" due to its similarity to the two previous games.

Like the previous installments, the player finds themselves kidnapped again by Granny and Grandpa. This time, they are joined by their granddaughter Slendrina, a new antagonist with behavior shared from her home series. This installment includes a new map, new items and new puzzles, as well as some minor changes in enemy behavior, such as Grandpa wielding a shotgun that functions as a ranged weapon. There are 2 ways to escape the mansion: the front gate and the subway train. This game also received positive reviews.

References

External links 
 

2017 video games
Android (operating system) games
Horror video games
Indie video games
IOS games
First-person video games
Video games developed in Sweden
Windows games